Competencia Es Ninguna is the second studio album by American singer-songwriter Carlos Mojica. It was released on June 1, 2015, by Criminal Sound Productions.

Track listing

References

2015 albums
Carlos Mojica albums